Bangari (Kannada: ಬಂಗಾರಿ) is a 1963 Indian Kannada film, directed and produced by G. V. Iyer. The film stars Kalyan Kumar, B. Vijayalakshmi, K. S. Ashwath and Narasimharaju in the lead roles. The film has musical score by G. K. Venkatesh.

Cast
Kalyan Kumar
B. Vijayalakshmi
K. S. Ashwath
Narasimharaju

References

External links
 

1963 films
1960s Kannada-language films
Films scored by G. K. Venkatesh
Films directed by G. V. Iyer